Whitfell (or sometimes Whit Fell) is a hill of  in the southwestern part of the Lake District. It is the highest point between Black Combe and Harter Fell on the broad ridge to the west of the Duddon Valley. Views from the summit include the full length of the Duddon Valley including its estuary; the western side of the Coniston fells; the Eskdale fells including Scafell and Bowfell; much of western Cumbria including the estuary of the Rivers Esk, Mite and Irt; the Isle of Man; as well as the hills to the south culminating in Black Combe.

The hill is relatively infrequently visited, and is a fairly characterless grassy mound, extensively grazed by sheep, though with a very large cairn, whose stones may be from a tumulus.

References

Marilyns of England
Fells of the Lake District